Bangla Manthar is a small town in the Punjab province of Pakistan. It is also known as Manthar and Manthar Bangla. 

It is about 32.4  km away from Rahim Yar Khan city, via a direct road link. It is about 19.4  km away from Sadiqabad city (with a direct road link). There is a mill of ethanol, called "United Ethanol Mill Limited", about 3 km away from Bangla Manthar on Sadiqabad-Bangla Manthar Road. Manthar contains a historic Bangla-type building that is now deteriorated. A mainstream canal along with a small canal passes from manthar. It provides a living hood to several people living beside it. The Rural Health Centre (RHC) of Manthar is operationalized to provide basic health facilities for the public. The rural veterinary hospital is built to provide veterinary health facilities in the area.

References

Populated places in Rahim Yar Khan District